Victor Khrisanfovich Kandinsky (6 April 1849, Byankino, Nerchinsky District, Siberia – 3 July 1889, Saint Petersburg) was a Russian psychiatrist, and was 2nd cousin to famed artist Wassily Kandinsky. He was born in Siberia into a large family of extremely wealthy businessmen. Victor Kandinsky was one of the famous figures in Russian psychiatry and most notable for his contributions to the understanding of hallucinations.

Biography 
He graduated from Moscow Imperial University Medical School in 1872 and started to work as a general practitioner in one of the hospitals in Moscow.

In 1877 as a military physician in the Balkans during the Russo-Turkish War, he began experiencing mood swings and hallucinations. He was medically discharged on 13 May 1877 and admitted to a naval hospital for treatment. At the end of the war, Kandinsky was awarded the light bronze medal in 1878, for participating the Russo-Turkish War.

In 1878 he married his medical nurse Elizaveta Karlovna Freimut.

Kandinsky's personal physician diagnosed him as having melancholia, but Kandinsky performed self-diagnosis, and he referred to his medical condition as Primäre Verrücktheit (German for "primary paranoid psychosis") which has been anachronistically translated into modern terms as a "schizophrenic-like state". Modern psychiatrists diagnosed him with paranoid schizophrenia.

In October 1878, Victor again entered a psychiatric hospital. So they sent him to A. Y. Frey Private Psychiatric Hospital in Saint Petersburg. In 1879 he went back to Moscow.

In 1881, he moved to Saint Petersburg. Kandinsky was a mental health worker employed by the  since August 1881.

Kandinsky joined the St. Petersburg Psychiatric Association on 23 January 1882.

In 1885 Kandinsky published a book written in German on pseudohallucinations "Kritische und klinische Betrachtungen im Gebiete der Sinnestäuschungen" in which he describes and details hallucinations largely based on his personal experiences.

In July 1889, feeling that his psychotic symptoms were returning, he took his own life by taking an overdose of opium. After he overdosed his last written words were: "1) I had about n grams of opium… 2) I'm reading "The Cossacks" by Tolstoy… 3) It is becoming difficult for me to read…". He died as a patient in the institution he had formerly run as the medical superintendent, the St. Nicholas Asylum in Saint Petersburg.

His wife Elizaveta Freimut-Kandinsky arranged the publication of his scientific papers and books ("On Pseudohallucinations" and "On Irresponsibility") and then committed suicide as well.

Scientific contribution 
Kandinsky published many journal papers in different languages (Russian, German, French) on various psychiatric, medical and even philosophical subjects.

In the monograph "On Pseudohallucinations" published posthumously in 1890, Kandinsky described a condition which involved being alienated from one's personal mental processes, combined with delusions of being physically and mentally influenced by external forces. The syndrome he described is now known as Kandinsky–Clérambault syndrome, named along with French psychiatrist Gaëtan Gatian de Clérambault. The syndrome also known as syndrome of psychic automatism.

Kandinsky had many types of pseudohallucinations – visual, tactile, auditory, in all senses except taste. Kandinsky's first work on pseudohallucinations was based upon detailed description of his own subjective personal experiences during his psychotic episodes.

Kandinsky's main contributions to psychiatry were in such areas as psychiatric classification, psychopathology and forensic psychiatry. In 1882, he created a system with 16 diagnostic categories of mental disorders. The diagnostic system was used on a daily basis by the Psychiatric Hospital of St. Nicholas the Wonderworker for years. Victor Kandinsky also coined the term  in 1890, and was intended to describe the disorder of perception and thinking. Ideophrenia was replaced by "schizophrenia", which remains in current diagnostic use.

Works 
Books in Russian
 
 
 

Reprinted books
 
 
 

Philosophy
 
 

Psychiatry
 
 
 
 

Medical articles (in medical journals)
 
 
 
 
 
 
 
 
 
 

In German and Polish
 
 
 
 

Translated into Russian

References

External links

 
 Catharina Bonnemann: Biography of Victor Khrisanfovich Kandinsky in: Biographical Archive of Psychiatry (BIAPSY).
 
 

1849 births
1889 deaths
People from Nerchinsky District
Russian psychiatrists
Russian military personnel of the Russo-Turkish War (1877–1878)
Suicides in Russia
People with schizophrenia
1880s suicides